= Marites Allen =

British-Filipino Feng Shui Master, author, TV personality, and entrepreneur

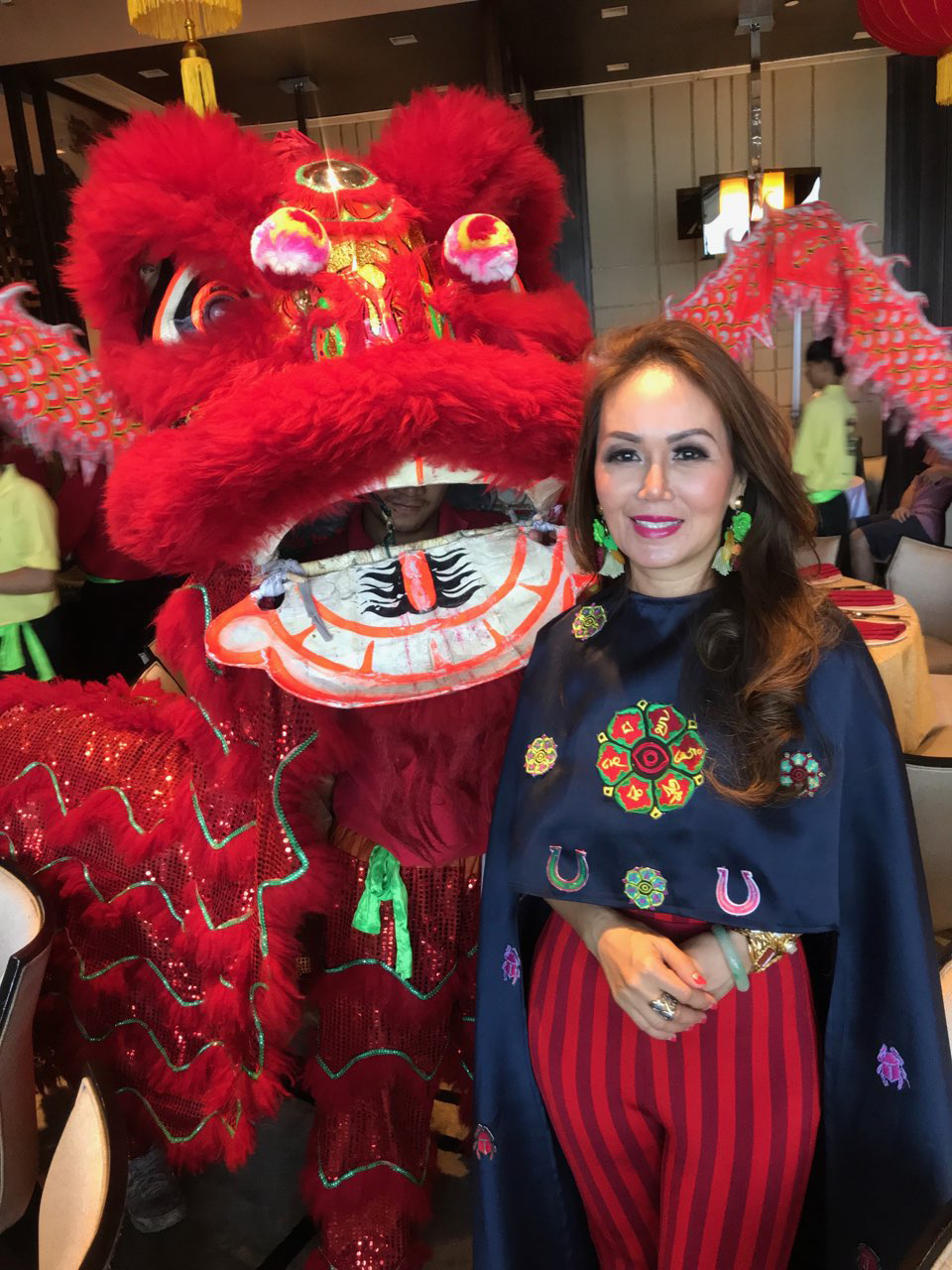
- Marites Allen
- Education: University of San Jose–Recoletos (BS); Ateneo Graduate School of Business (MBA-MM)
- Occupations: Feng Shui Master, author, entrepreneur, media personality
- Years active: 2004–present
- Known for: Feng shui and Chinese astrology commentary, annual forecasts, FRIGGA Charmed Life, Destara
- Notable work: Chinese Astrology: Decode the Zodiac to Live Your Best Life
- Website: https://maritesallen.com

Marites Allen is a British-Filipino Feng Shui Master, author, entrepreneur, and media personality. She is known for her public work in feng shui and Chinese astrology in the Philippines, including annual Lunar New Year forecasts, books, media appearances, and public events.

Allen is the founder of World of Feng Shui Philippines and FRIGGA Charmed Life, a feng shui-inspired fashion and lifestyle brand established in 2012. In 2026 she launched Destara, a companion mobile app personally curated by Marites Allen and supported by an artificial-intelligence-based lifestyle and astrology platform.

== Early life and education ==
Allen grew up in Masbate as the twelfth of fourteen children. She attended Masbate National Comprehensive High School and earned a Bachelor of Science degree in computer science from the University of San Jose–Recoletos in 1989.

She later completed the MBA-MM program in Business Management at the Ateneo Graduate School of Business in 1998.

Allen relocated to the United Kingdom in 2010 and became a British citizen in 2013. In the same year, she completed fashion-related studies at the London College of Fashion, part of the University of the Arts London.

== Career ==
=== World of Feng Shui Philippines ===
According to profiles published by The Philippine Star, Allen became interested in feng shui in 2004 after attending a feng shui conference conducted by Lillian Too. She later undertook professional training and opened a World of Feng Shui franchise boutique in Manila.

Over the following years, she expanded her consulting practice, opened additional boutiques, wrote newspaper columns, and made regular radio and television appearances.

=== Public profile and media work ===
Allen became known in the Philippines through annual Chinese New Year forecasts and public commentary on feng shui and Chinese astrology.

She established the Philippine Feng Shui Convention, described by some publications as a recurring event devoted to feng shui and Chinese astrology.

During the COVID-19 pandemic, Allen continued conducting consultations and forecasts through online platforms.

=== Publishing ===
Allen has published annual feng shui planners, almanacs, and horoscope guides.

Her book Chinese Astrology: Decode the Zodiac to Live Your Best Life was published in the United Kingdom by Greenfinch in January 2023 and in the United States by Mandala Publishing in September 2023.

=== Technology initiatives ===
In 2018, Allen launched a feng shui mobile application developed with ABS-CBN Publishing and Synergy88 Digital.

In 2026, she introduced Destara, an AI-assisted lifestyle and astrology application integrating concepts from feng shui and Chinese astrology.

=== Recognition ===
Philippine media outlets have reported that Allen was conferred the title "Master in Feng Shui" by the International Feng Shui Association in 2013 and described her as the first Filipina recipient of the designation.

She has frequently been referred to in Philippine media as the "Feng Shui Queen".

== Published works ==
- Chinese Astrology: Decode the Zodiac to Live Your Best Life (2023)
- Feng Shui Almanac (annual)
- Feng Shui Planner (annual)
- Annual zodiac-sign horoscope guides
